Zubovo is a rural locality (a selo) and the administrative center of Zubovsky Selsoviet, Ufimsky District, Bashkortostan, Russia. The population was 2,042 as of 2010. There are 70 streets.

Geography 
Zubovo is located 15 km south of Ufa (the district's administrative centre) by road. Chesnokovka is the nearest rural locality.

References 

Rural localities in Ufimsky District